Sage & Spirit is a compilation album by the rock band the Grateful Dead.  It contains ten songs – eight recorded in the studio and two live – selected from various albums.  It was produced as a vinyl LP in a limited edition of 4,000 copies, and released on April 3, 2019 in conjunction with Record Store Day.

The tracks on Sage & Spirit were excerpted from the albums Workingman's Dead (1970), American Beauty (1970), Europe '72 (1972), Wake of the Flood (1973), From the Mars Hotel (1974), Blues for Allah (1975), Shakedown Street (1978), and Go to Heaven (1980).

Sage & Spirit was a cross-marketing promotion with Dogfish Head Brewery.  The cover of the album depicts a dancing bear holding a mug of beer.  Grateful Dead Productions and Dogfish Head Brewery had previously collaborated on a beer called American Beauty, a pale ale brewed with granola and honey.

Track listing 
Side A
"Sugar Magnolia" (Bob Weir, Robert Hunter) – 3:17 – from American Beauty
"Eyes of the World" (Jerry Garcia, Hunter) – 5:20 – from Wake of the Flood
"Lost Sailor" (Weir, John Perry Barlow) – 5:54 – from Go to Heaven
"Saint of Circumstance" (Weir, Barlow) – 5:40 – from Go to Heaven
"High Time" (Garcia, Hunter) – 5:12 – from Workingman's Dead
Side B
"Sage & Spirit" (Weir) – 3:04 – from Blues for Allah
"Jack Straw" (Weir, Hunter) – 4:46 – from Europe '72
"Unbroken Chain" (Phil Lesh, Robert Petersen) – 6:45 – from From the Mars Hotel
"Brown-Eyed Women" (Garcia, Hunter) – 4:45 – from Europe '72
"If I Had the World to Give" (Garcia, Hunter) – 4:50 – from Shakedown Street

Personnel 
Grateful Dead
Jerry Garcia – guitar, vocals
Bob Weir – guitar, vocals
Phil Lesh – guitar, vocals
Bill Kreutzmann – drums
Mickey Hart – drums
Ron "Pigpen" McKernan – organ on "Brown Eyed Women" and percussion on "Jack Straw"
Keith Godchaux – keyboards
Brent Mydland – keyboards, vocals
Donna Jean Godchaux – vocals

Production
Produced by Grateful Dead
Produced for release by David Lemieux
Mastering: David Glasser
Lacquer cutting: Chris Bellman
Cover illustration: Michael Hacker
Design, layout: Rory Wilson

References 

Grateful Dead compilation albums
Rhino Records compilation albums
2019 compilation albums